Hartwig may refer to:
Hartwig (given name)
Hartwig (surname)
Hartwig (lunar crater)
Hartwig (Martian crater)